The 2014 Columbus Crew season was the club's nineteenth season of existence, and their nineteenth consecutive season in Major League Soccer, the top flight of American soccer.

Background

Review 

The 2014 season was a significant break from the past, particularly off the field. New owner Anthony Precourt, having purchased the team from Hunt Sports Group midway through 2013, made his presence felt often through the year. The team enjoyed its best performance in several years, including an appearance in the playoffs for the first time in three years. Gregg Berhalter was handed the helm, serving both as head coach and sporting director. He was joined by a trio of assistant coaches that included fellow World Cup veteran Josh Wolff, and longtime MLS goalkeeper Pat Onstad.

Columbus started the season with three consecutive victories, including a road win over the Seattle Sounders. This torrid beginning then cooled dramatically as Columbus won only one of their next 16 games. Dominic Oduro, the leading scorer from the previous year, was dealt to Toronto while Jairo Arrieta likewise struggled to make an impact. Defensively a pair of new Costa Rican signings, Giancarlo Gonzalez and Waylon Francis, missed significant time due to Costa Rica's run to the quarterfinals of the World Cup. The defensive changes could have been more drastic, however, as Michael Parkhurst was left off the American squad.

A handful of players emerged in the latter half of the season, however, leading the team to a dramatic turnaround and ultimately a postseason berth. Federico Higuain was joined atop the scoring charts by third-year winger Ethan Finlay, with both ending the year with 11 goals and seven assists. Other significant players included the pairing of Tony Tchani and Wil Trapp at holding midfield and goalkeeper Steve Clark.

Ultimately, however, the team's quest for its first hardware since 2009 came up empty. It was eliminated from the U.S. Open Cup after two games, falling once again to the Chicago Fire. The mid season doldrums ruled the club out of contention for Supporters Shield (won dramatically on the last day of the season by Seattle). Finally, the team was comprehensively outplayed in the playoffs by the New England Revolution, defeated 7-3 on aggregate over a two-game series. The team finished their last playoff game with only nine players on the field after ejections to Ethan Finlay and Justin Meram.

Off the field, new owner Anthony Precourt made sweeping changes. Long-serving General Manager Mark McCullers left the organization in the spring, replaced by Andy Loughnane after a nationwide search. While there was widespread criticism of the team's new television contract with Time Warner Sportschannel Ohio, the team continued its success at the turnstile. Three years after team attendance plummeted to less than 12,000, the team enjoyed five sellout crowds during 2014 and finished the year with the highest total attendance in the history of Crew Stadium.

The most significant change, however, was the revelation of a new team identity. The team's logo, unchanged since 1996, was jettisoned in favor of a new design that tried to better reflect the team's relationship to central Ohio. The name of the team was also changed slightly, becoming Columbus Crew SC. These changes were nearly unanimously applauded, in sharp contrast to the reaction to a new MLS logo that was also unveiled during the course of the season.

Roster 
Major League Soccer team are limited to eight players without U.S. citizenship, a permanent resident (green card holder), or the holder of other special status (e.g., refugee or asylum status). These international roster slots can be traded.

Competitions

Preseason

MLS

Standings

Eastern Conference

Overall table

Results summary

Results by round

Match results

U.S. Open Cup

MLS Cup Playoffs

Conference Semifinals 

New England Revolution won 7–3 on aggregate

Friendlies

Kirk Urso Memorial Match

Statistics

Appearances 

Numbers outside parentheses denote appearances as starter.
Numbers in parentheses denote appearances as substitute.
Players with no appearances are not included in the list.

Goals and assists

Disciplinary record

Additional suspensions

Transfers 

The pre-season transfer market was primarily spent strengthening the defensive line that saw the exit of Chad Marshall (Seattle Sounders) and Andy Gruenebaum (Sporting KC). Steve Clark (GK), Waylon Francis (LB), Giancarlo González (CB), and USMNT Standout Michael Parkhurst would be the new starting defensive team along with long-time defender Josh Williams.

Jairo Arrieta has his option declined on 22 November 2013, but was later re-signed on 18 December 2013.

In

Out

Loan in 
Kelechi Iheanacho Nigeria

Loan out

Recognition 
MLS Player of the Week

MLS Save of the Week

MLS Team of the Week

Kits

See also 
 Columbus Crew
 2014 in American soccer
 2014 Major League Soccer season

References 

Columbus Crew seasons
Columbus Crew
Columbus Crew
2014 in sports in Ohio